is a railway station in the city of Utsunomiya, Tochigi, Japan, operated by the private railway operator Tobu Railway. The station is numbered "TN-38".

Lines

Station layout
The station consists of one island platform with an elevated station building located above the tracks.

Platforms

Adjacent stations

History
Esojima Station opened on 1 July 1944.
From 17 March 2012, station numbering was introduced on all Tobu lines, with Esojima Station becoming "TN-39".

Passenger statistics
In fiscal 2019, the station was used by an average of 2102 passengers daily (boarding passengers only).

Surrounding area
Utsunomiya Hospital

See also
 List of railway stations in Japan

References

External links

  

Railway stations in Tochigi Prefecture
Stations of Tobu Railway
Railway stations in Japan opened in 1944
Tobu Utsunomiya Line
Utsunomiya